The 2015–16 Washington State Cougars women's basketball team represented Washington State University during the 2015–16 NCAA Division I women's basketball season. The cougars, led by ninth year head coach June Daugherty, played their games at the Beasley Coliseum and were members of the Pac-12 Conference. They finished the season 14–16, 5–13 in Pac-12 play to finish in ninth place. They lost in the first round of the Pac-12 women's basketball tournament to USC.

Roster

Schedule

|-
!colspan=9 style="background:#981E32; color:#FFFFFF;"| Exhibition

|-
!colspan=9 style="background:#981E32; color:#FFFFFF;"| Non-conference regular season

|-
!colspan=9 style="background:#981E32; color:#FFFFFF;"| Pac-12 regular season

|-
!colspan=9 style="background:#981E32;"| Pac-12 Women's Tournament

Rankings

See also
2015–16 Washington State Cougars men's basketball team

References

Washington State Cougars women's basketball seasons
Washington State
Washington State
Washington State